Zarna Garg is an Indian-American stand-up comedian and screenwriter. CNBC called her "the zany, outspoken voice of the Indian American woman."

Early life

Zarna Garg was born in India. She lived in Mumbai as a teenager. Her mother died of jaundice when Garg was fourteen. Her father demanded that Garg get married the day after the death. Rather than have an arranged marriage, Garg moved out of the house and stayed with friends and family. Eventually, she moved to Ohio to live with her sister. She attended law school in the United States.

Career 
Zarna’s debut romantic comedy screenplay “Rearranged” won the Best Comedy Screenplay Award at the 2019 Austin Film Festival, and was also a 2019 Academy Nicholl Fellowships Semi-Finalist.

In 2021, Garg won Kevin Hart's comedy competition on Peacock, "Lyft Comics." She also won the Ladies of Laughter Award in the Newcomer Winner category.

In 2022 she was highlighted as "one of the gutsiest women comedians in America" in "Gutsy" on Apple TV, appeared on the Tamron Hall Show, the TODAY Show, and This American Life to discuss how her daughter Zoya inspired her to start her stand up comedy career. In 2023, Garg hosted the National Women's History Museum's Women Making History Awards.

Personal life 
In 1998 Zarna married Shalabh Garg. They have three children together and live in New York City.

References

External links 
 

20th-century births
Year of birth missing (living people)
Living people
Indian emigrants to the United States
American stand-up comedians
Comedians from New York City
21st-century American comedians
American women comedians
American women screenwriters
21st-century American screenwriters
Screenwriters from New York (state)
Writers from New York City